Syed Khawar Ali Shah is a Pakistani politician who had been a member of the Provincial Assembly of the Punjab from August 2018 till January 2023.

Political career

.He was elected to the Provincial Assembly of the Punjab as an independent candidate from Constituency PP-203 (Khanewal-I) in 2018 Pakistani general election .

He joined Pakistan Tehreek-e-Insaf  (PTI) following his election.

References

Living people
Pakistan Tehreek-e-Insaf MPAs (Punjab)
Year of birth missing (living people)